Charles William Wentworth Fitzwilliam, 5th Earl Fitzwilliam in the peerage of Ireland, and 3rd Earl Fitzwilliam in the peerage of Great Britain,  (4 May 1786 – 4 October 1857) was a British nobleman and politician. He was president three times of the Royal Statistical Society in 1838–1840, 1847–1849, and 1853–1855; and president of the British Association for the Advancement of Science in its inaugural year (1831–2).

He was born the only son of William Fitzwilliam, 4th Earl Fitzwilliam and his first wife, Lady Charlotte Ponsonby. He was a pupil at Eton College from 1796 to 1802.

Before inheriting the Earldom on 8 February 1833 on the death of his father, he was known by the courtesy title of Viscount Milton. Under that name, he was the Whig Member of Parliament for Northamptonshire between 1831 and 1832.

The family seat was Wentworth Woodhouse, reputedly the largest private house in England.

Family
He married the Hon. Mary Dundas (30 May 1787 – 1 November 1830) on 8 July 1806; she was his cousin and the daughter of Thomas Dundas, 1st Baron Dundas and Lady Charlotte Fitzwilliam, the 4th Earl's sister. They had thirteen children:
 Lady Charlotte Wentworth-FitzWilliam (12 July 1807 – ????)
 Hon. Margaret Bruce Wentworth-FitzWilliam (27 January 1809 – 03 Feb 1809)
 Lady Mary Wentworth-FitzWilliam (2 May 1810 – 15 May 1893).  Married Leonard Thompson, Esq.
 William Charles Wentworth-FitzWilliam, Viscount Milton (18 January 1812 – 8 November 1835). Married on 15 August 1833 to Lady Selina Charlotte Jenkinson, daughter of Charles Jenkinson, 3rd Earl of Liverpool. They had two children; the younger survived:
 Stillborn son (14 November 1834)
 Hon. Mary Selina Charlotte Fitzwilliam (9 January 1836 – 4 January 1899); married Henry Portman, 2nd Viscount Portman
 Lady Frances Laura Wentworth-FitzWilliam (22 October 1813 – 25 August 1887); married on 23 June 1837 to Reverend William Bridgman-Simpson. They had five children:
 Mary Bridgeman-Simpson (d. 18 January 1880)
 Beatrice Dorothy Mary Bridgeman-Simpson (d. 8 July 1936)
 Orlando John George Bridgeman-Simpson (27 August 1838 – 5 July 1907)
 George Arthur Bridgeman-Simpson (14 November 1846 – 16 November 1913)
 Admiral Sir Francis Charles Bridgeman-Simpson (7 December 1848 – 17 February 1929)
 William Thomas Spencer Wentworth-Fitzwilliam, 6th Earl Fitzwilliam (12 October 1815 – 20 February 1902) 
 Hon. George Wentworth-Fitzwilliam (3 May 1817 – 4 March 1874); married on 18 March 1865 to Alice Louisa Anson, daughter of daughter of Maj.-Gen. Hon. George Anson. They had three children:
 George Charles Wentworth-Fitzwilliam (2 January 1866 – 8 December 1935) Married on 31 December 1888 to Daisy Evelyn Lyster, daughter of Charles Stephan Lyster. They had two sons:
 George James Charles Wentworth-FitzWilliam (May 1888 – 1955). Married in 1914 to Lorna Beryl Morgan. They had two children:
 Richard John Godric Wentworth-Fitzwilliam (3 February 1916 – October 1987)
 Rosemary Ann Wentworth-FitzWilliam (24 April 1918 – March 1997)
 William Thomas George Wentworth-Fitzwilliam, 10th Earl Fitzwilliam (28 May 1904 – 21 September 1979)
 Alice Mary Wentworth-Fitzwilliam (18 October 1869 – 3 March 1956)
 Maud Wentworth-Fitzwilliam (27 February 1871 – 15 July 1949)
 Lady Anne Wentworth-Fitzwilliam (14 May 1819 – 29 April 1879). Married on 10 October 1838, in the Chapel at Wentworth Woodhouse, to Sir James John Randoll Mackenzie of Scatwell, 6th Bt
 Lady Dorothy Wentworth-FitzWilliam 02 Apr 1822 – ????)
 Hon. John Wentworth-FitzWilliam (18 September 1823 – 15 June 1824)
 Hon. Charles William Wentworth-Fitzwilliam (18 September 1826 – 20 December 1894); married on 24 August 1854 to Anne Dundas, daughter of Reverend Hon. Thomas Lawrence Dundas. Died without issue.
 [a son] (b. and d. 18 Mar 1828)
 Lady Albreda Elizabeth Wentworth-Fitzwilliam (3 September 1829 – 11 November 1891); married on 21 June 1853 to Fitzpatrick Henry Vernon, 2nd Baron Lyveden

References

Pagnamenta, Peter (2012) USA W.W.Norton & Co. Prairie Fever: British Aristocrats in the American West 1830-1890. Page 136,137.

External links 
 

1786 births
1857 deaths
People educated at Eton College
Milton, Charles Wentworth-FitzWilliam, Viscount
Presidents of the Royal Statistical Society
Milton, Charles Wentworth-Fitzwilliam, Viscount
Milton, Charles Wentworth-Fitzwilliam, Viscount
Milton, Charles Wentworth-Fitzwilliam, Viscount
Milton, Charles Wentworth-Fitzwilliam, Viscount
Milton, Charles Wentworth-Fitzwilliam, Viscount
Milton, Charles Wentworth-Fitzwilliam, Viscount
Milton, Charles Wentworth-Fitzwilliam, Viscount
Milton, Charles Wentworth-Fitzwilliam, Viscount
Fitzwilliam, E5
Milton, Charles Wentworth-Fitzwilliam, Viscount
English tax resisters
Earls in the Peerage of Great Britain
Fellows of the Royal Society
Knights of the Garter
Alumni of Trinity College, Cambridge
Earls Fitzwilliam
Surtees Society